Muottas Muragl (2,454 m) is a location on the southern slopes of the Blais da Muottas (2,568 m), a summit at the western end of the range descending from Piz Vadret, in the Swiss canton of Graubünden. It overlooks the Engadin, between the towns of Samedan, St. Moritz and Pontresina. The mountain is within the municipality of Samedan.

Muottas Muragl is accessible by a funicular railway, between Celerina and Pontresina, the Muottas-Muragl-Bahn, from the train stations Punt Muragl and Punt Muragl Staz, both served by the Rhaetian Railway. Muottas Muragl includes a hotel and a panoramic restaurant.

References

External links
 
 Muottas Muragl official website

Engadin
Mountains of the Alps
Mountains of Switzerland
Mountains of Graubünden
Two-thousanders of Switzerland
Samedan